"Spirit of the Season" is a song from the movie The Polar Express. A cover of the song by the Mormon Tabernacle Choir and Sissel was nominated for 2 Grammys, Best Classical Crossover Album and Best Engineered Album - Classical. It was also featured in the former Disney World Christmas fireworks show at the Magic Kingdom titled “Holiday Wishes”.

References

2004 songs
American Christmas songs
Songs written for animated films
Songs written by Glen Ballard
Songs written by Alan Silvestri